The tenth mandala of the Rigveda has 191 hymns. Together with Mandala 1, it forms the latest part of the Rigveda, containing much mythological material, including the Purusha sukta (10.90) and the dialogue of Sarama with the Panis (10.108), and notably containing several dialogue hymns. The subjects of the hymns cover a wider spectrum than in the other books, dedicated not only to deities or natural phenomena, including deities that are not prominent enough to receive their own hymns in the other books (Nirrti 10.59,  Asamati 10.60, Ratri 10.127, Aranyani 10.146, Indrani 10.159), but also to objects like dice (10.34), herbs (10.97), press-stones (for Soma, 10.94, 175) and abstract concepts like liberality (towards the rishi, 10.117), creation (10.129 (the Nasadiya Sukta), 130, 190), knowledge (10.71), speech, spirit (10.58), faith (10.151), a charm against evil dreams (10.164).

10.15, dedicated to the forefathers, contains a reference to the emerging rite of cremation in verse 14, where ancestors  "both cremated (agnidagdhá-) and uncremated (ánagnidagdha-)" are invoked.

10.47 to 50 are to Indra Vaikuntha, "Indra son of Vikuntha". Vikuntha was an Asuri whom Indra had allowed to become his second mother. The rishi of 10.47 is called Saptagu, while that of 10.48-50 is likewise called Indra Vaikuntha.

10.85 is a marriage hymn, evoking the marriage of Suryā, daughter of Surya (the Sun), another form of Ushas, the prototypical bride.

RV 10.121 (the Hiranyagarbha sukta) is another hymn dealing with creation, containing elements of monotheism. It has a recurring pada "what God shall we adore with our oblation?", in verse 1 named Hiranyagarbha "the golden egg" or Cosmic egg, later a name of Brahma, in verse 10 addressed as Prajapati.

10.129 (the Nasadiya sukta) and 130 are creation hymns, probably the best known Rigvedic hymns in the west, especially 10.129.7:
He, the first origin of this creation, whether he formed it all or did not form it, / Whose eye controls this world in highest heaven, he verily knows it, or perhaps he knows not. (Griffith)
These hymns exhibit a level of philosophical speculation very atypical of the Rigveda, which for the most part is occupied with ritualistic invocation. 

10.145 is attributed to Indrani. It is a spell for a jealous wife to get rid of more favoured rival. Atypical of the Rigveda, similar spells are found in the Atharvaveda.

10.154 is a funeral hymn, asking for that the departed may join those who attained heaven through tapas. Padas 1 cd is reminiscent of the Norse concept of Valhalla: 
To those for whom the meath flows forth, even to those let him depart. (Griffith)

10.155 is against the "one-eyed limping hag" Arayi.

10.166, attributed to Anila, is a spell for the destruction of rivals, similar to 10.145, but this time to be uttered by men who want to be rid of male rivals.

10.173 and 174 are benedictions of a newly elected king. 

The rishis of the 10th Mandala are divided into Shudrasuktas and Mahasuktas, that is,  sages who have composed "small" vs. "great" hymns.

Selected hymns

See also
Rigvedic dialogue hymns
Gambler's Lament

References

External links 

 – English translation by Ralph T. H. Griffith

Mandala A